Scum of the Earth is an American heavy metal band. They have released three albums and eight singles. The band formed in 2003 when Rob Zombie set aside his music career, focusing on writing and directing movies.

Members 
Current
 Riggs – vocals, rhythm guitar (2003–present); lead guitar (2013–present)
 Eddie Travis – drums, percussion (2011–present)
 Nick Mason – bass (2011–present)
Former
 Mike Tempesta – lead guitar (2003–2005)
 John Tempesta – drums, percussion (2003–2006)
 Clay Campbell – bass (2003–2007)
 Skyla Talon – lead guitar (2005–2008)
 Brandon Workman – bass (2007–2010)
 Dan Laudo – drums (2007–2010)
 Jesse Saint – lead guitar (2008–2013)
 John Dolmayan – drums (2004)
 Ivan de Prume – drums (2006–2007)

Timeline

Discography 
Albums
2004: Blah...Blah...Blah...Love Songs for the New Millennium
2007: Sleaze Freak
2012: The Devil Made Me Do It

Singles
2013: "Zombie Apocalypse" (featuring Volkstroker)
2013: "The Devil Made Me Do It 3" (featuring Volkstroker)
2013: "Born Again Masochist" (featuring Exageist)
2017: "Dance Motherf***er"
2020: "Bigfoot and the Armies of Puma Punka"

Band name 
The band's name comes from a 1978 episode of the television series WKRP in Cincinnati. The Hoodlum Rock episode is about a concert being promoted at the station, of a "hoodlum rock" band called Scum of the Earth.

External links 
Official Facebook page
MK Magazine review
Band biography at EclipseRecords.com

Heavy metal musical groups from Nevada
Musical groups established in 2003